Curlin is a surname. Notable people with the surname include:

William G. Curlin (1927–2017), American Roman Catholic bishop
William P. Curlin Jr. (born 1933), American politician and lawyer
Zach Curlin (1890–1970), American football and basketball player and coach